Bagno  is a settlement in the administrative district of Gmina Świeszyno, within Koszalin County, West Pomeranian Voivodeship, in north-western Poland.

The settlement has a population of 49.

References

Bagno